Fengshan may refer to:

Feng Shan, Chinese religious ritual

Geographic names

People's Republic of China
Fengshan County, Guangxi

Subdistricts
Fengshan Subdistrict, Shanwei, in Cheng District, Shanwei, Guangdong
Fengshan Subdistrict, Fengcheng, Liaoning
Fengshan Subdistrict, Lüliang, in Lishi District, Lüliang, Shanxi
Fengshan Subdistrict, Yuyao, Zhejiang

Towns
Written as "":
Fengshan, Hua'an County, Fujian
Fengshan, Xiaochang County, Hubei
Written as "":
Fengshan, Luoyuan County, Fujian
Fengshan, Bobai County, Guangxi
Fengshan, Liucheng County, Guangxi
Fengshan, Guizhou, in Fuquan
Fengshan, Fengning County, Hebei
Fengshan, Shijiazhuang, in Jingxing Mining District, Shijiazhuang, Hebei
Fengshan, Tonghe County, Heilongjiang
Fengshan, Luotian County, Hubei
Fengshan, Jinggu County, Jinggu Dai and Yi Autonomous County, Yunnan
Fengshan, Fengqing County, Fengqing County, Yunnan

Townships
Written as "":
Fengshan Township, Heilongjiang, in Hailun
Fengshan Township, Shicheng County, Jiangxi

Written as "":
Fengshan Township, Anyuan County, Jiangxi
Fengshan Township, Sichuan, in Shunqing District, Nanchong

Villages
Fengshan, Dongfeng, in Dongsheng, Shishou, Jingzhou, Hubei

Singapore
Fengshan Single Member Constituency

Taiwan
Fongshan District, district of Kaohsiung
Fengshan Old City (）, or Old City of Zuoying, walled city in Tsoying, Kaohsiung
Fengshan River, in the north of the island
Fengshan railway station